Arkadiy Holovchenko (born 5 August 1936) is a Ukrainian former swimmer. He competed in the men's 200 metre breaststroke at the 1960 Summer Olympics for the Soviet Union.

References

External links
 

1936 births
Living people
Ukrainian male breaststroke swimmers
Olympic swimmers of the Soviet Union
Swimmers at the 1960 Summer Olympics
Sportspeople from Kropyvnytskyi
Soviet male breaststroke swimmers